Joseph Binder may refer to:
 Joseph Binder (painter)
 Joseph Binder (graphic designer)